Adlan II (died 1789) was the ruler of the Kingdom of Sennar (1776 - 1789). 

He defeated the Vizier Rajab of Sennar and Fiki Haji Mohammed Majdub in the Battle of Taras in 1787.

Notes

1789 deaths
Rulers of Sennar
18th-century rulers in Africa
Year of birth unknown